Greenfield is a town in Blaine County, Oklahoma, United States. The population was 93 at the 2010 census.

History
The 80 original acres of Greenfield began as the homestead in 1899 of one George Evans.  Somewhere in the 1900-1902 timeframe, the Choctaw Northern Railroad built through the area, its line running from Geary, Oklahoma to its termination at Anthony, Kansas.  The railroad bought the farm from then-owners T.G. Curtner and J.M. Gray, proceeding to plat the town and sell lots.  By 1913, the town had about 300 inhabitants, a newspaper (The Greenfield Hustler), a bank, a lumberyard, two livery barns, two grain elevators, a grist mill, a hotel, an opera house, and various merchants and contractors.

Greenfield still has freight rail service through the AT&L Railroad.

Geography
It is along U.S. Routes 270 and 281, halfway between Watonga, the county seat, and Geary.

Demographics

As of the census of 2000, there were 123 people, 55 households, and 37 families residing in the town. There were 62 housing units at an average density of 463.6 per square mile (184.1/km2). The racial makeup of the town was 88.62% White, 1.63% African American and 9.76% Native American.

There were 55 households, out of which 23.6% had children under the age of 18 living with them, 47.3% were married couples living together, 14.5% had a female householder with no husband present, and 32.7% were non-families. 32.7% of all households were made up of individuals, and 14.5% had someone living alone who was 65 years of age or older. The average household size was 2.24 and the average family size was 2.78.

In the town, the population was spread out, with 19.5% under the age of 18, 8.9% from 18 to 24, 22.8% from 25 to 44, 35.0% from 45 to 64, and 13.8% who were 65 years of age or older. The median age was 44 years. For every 100 females, there were 98.4 males. For every 100 females age 18 and over, there were 98.0 males.

The median income for a household in the town was $20,694, and the median income for a family was $21,607. Males had a median income of $26,250 versus $20,000 for females. The per capita income for the town was $13,097. There were 20.0% of families and 17.6% of the population living below the poverty line, including 37.5% of under eighteens and 11.1% of those over 64.

References

External links
 Encyclopedia of Oklahoma History and Culture - Greenfield

Towns in Blaine County, Oklahoma
Towns in Oklahoma